The Milan Exposition Elevated Railway was a temporary elevated railway in Milan, Italy, constructed for the 1906 World's Fair.  The railway connected two venues of the exposition: Parco Sempione and Piazza d'Armi (now the site of CityLife).  The railway operated for entire duration of the exposition, from April 29 until November 11.

The railway was double-tracked and ran along a -long wood viaduct.  Railcars were electrified by overhead wires and ran at a maximum speed of  an hour.

References

Railway lines opened in 1906
Railway lines closed in 1906